West Hills may refer to:

 West Hills, Los Angeles, California
 West Hills (New Haven), a neighborhood in the Amity area of New Haven, Connecticut
 West Hills, Baltimore, Maryland, a neighborhood
 West Hills, New York
 West Hills (Pennsylvania), the western suburbs of Pittsburgh
 West Hills, Pennsylvania
 West Hills, Knoxville, Tennessee)
 West Hills (Box Elder County, Utah), a mountain range
 Tualatin Mountains, a.k.a. the West Hills of Portland, Oregon, United States
 West Hills Community College District, a community college district located in California, with campuses in Coalinga, Lemoore, etc.

See also
West Hill (disambiguation)
Western Hills (disambiguation)